Kathrin Kadelbach (born 1 August 1983 in Berlin) is a German sports sailor. At the 2012 Summer Olympics, she competed in the Women's 470 class.

References

German female sailors (sport)
1983 births
Living people
Olympic sailors of Germany
Sailors at the 2012 Summer Olympics – 470